The Astrologer (also known as Suicide Cult) is a 1975 American horror film directed by James Glickenhaus and starring Bob Byrd, Mark Buntzman, and James Glickenhaus.

Plot

A scientist who is investigating reports of the Second Coming of Christ ends up in conflict with a Satan-worshipping suicide cult.

Cast 
Bob Byrd as Alexei
Mark Buntzman as Kajerste
James Glickenhaus as Spy
Alison McCarthy
Al Narcisse
Monica Tidwell as Kate Abarnel
Ivy White as Indian Maiden

Production

Glickenhaus says that he made the movie for about $20,000. "I'd inherited some money," Glickenhaus told The New York Times, "and I took all of it and lost it making a movie called 'The Astrologer.' I'd been to film school, but film school was oriented more toward the avant-garde in those days, and I didn't really know what a master was or a cutaway or a closeup. And I had great trouble conveying ideas, except in dialogue. So 'The Astrologer,' which was about 79 minutes long, was probably 60 minutes of dialogue. I mean, it was interminable. I didn't think it was interminable then. I thought it was great and interesting and fascinating to listen to." The film took him two years to produce from start to finish.

The film's soundtrack was composed by Brad Fiedel, in his debut.

Release

With no independent distributors interested in acquiring the film, Glickenhaus convinced some drive-in theaters in the South to screen it. He later recalled, "Even though it was a terrible movie, people didn't absolutely hate it. But I realized by watching them that the only parts they liked were the parts with action."

Reception

References

External links
 
 

1975 films
1970s supernatural horror films
1975 independent films
American independent films
American supernatural horror films
1970s English-language films
Films about cults
Films about Satanism
Films based on American novels
Films based on horror novels
Films directed by James Glickenhaus
Films scored by Brad Fiedel
Films set in Bihar
Films set in London
Films set in Maryland
Films set in New York City
Films set in Virginia
1975 directorial debut films
1970s American films